Hans Weingartner (born 2 November 1977) is an author, director and producer of films. Born in Feldkirch, Vorarlberg, he attended the Austrian Association of Cinematography in Vienna and earned a diploma as a camera assistant. Later, he studied film at the Academy of Media Arts KHM in Cologne, Germany. He also has studied neuroscience at the University of Vienna and graduated from the neurosurgical department at the Free University of Berlin’s Steglitz Clinic.

Filmography

Full length feature films 
 The White Sound (Das weisse Rauschen, 2001)
 The Edukators (Die fetten Jahre sind vorbei, 2004)
 Reclaim Your Brain (Free Rainer – Dein Fernseher lügt, 2007)
 Germany 09 (Segment "Gefährder", 2009)
 Hut in the Woods (Die Summe meiner einzelnen Teile, 2011)
 303 (303, 2018)

Awards 
 2001 First Steps Award  for Das weisse Rauschen as Best Picture
 2001  for Das weisse Rauschen
 2001 Filmfestival Max Ophüls Prize for Das weisse Rauschen as Best Film
 2002 German Film Award for Das weisse Rauschen as Best Feature Film
 2003 German Film Critics Award for Best Debut Film for Das weisse Rauschen
 2004 Nomination The Edukators for the Golden Palm at the Cannes Film Festival
 2004 German Film Critics Award for The Edukators as Best Feature Film
 2004 Förderpreis Neues Deutsches Kino for Best Director and Best Script for The Edukators
 2004 Jury Prize at the Cape Town World Cinema Festival for The Edukators
 2004 Prize of the DEFA-Stiftung
 2005 Audience Award at the Miami International Film Festival for The Edukators
 2005 German Film Award in Silver / Silver Lola for The Edukators as Best Feature Film and Best Director
 2012 Nomination for German Film Award in the category Best Director for Hut in the Woods
 2012 Nomination for German Film Award in the category Best Feature Film for Hut in the Woods
 2018 Regiepreis Ludwigshafen for 303

References

External links
 

Austrian film directors
German-language film directors
1977 births
Living people
University of Vienna alumni
Free University of Berlin alumni